Joseph R. Cavallaro is a Professor of Electrical and Computer Engineering at Rice University and director of the Center for Multimedia Communication in Houston, Texas.He join the faculty of Rice University in August 1988. He was named Fellow of the Institute of Electrical and Electronics Engineers (IEEE) in 2015 for contributions to VLSI architectures and algorithms for signal processing and wireless communications.

Cavallaro got his B.S.E.E. from the University of Pennsylvania in 1981 and a year later got his M.S.E.E. from Princeton University. He then attended Cornell University, where he got his Ph.D. in 1988.

References

External links

20th-century births
Living people
American computer scientists
American electrical engineers
University of Pennsylvania School of Engineering and Applied Science alumni
Princeton University School of Engineering and Applied Science alumni
Cornell University alumni
Rice University faculty
Fellow Members of the IEEE
Year of birth missing (living people)
Place of birth missing (living people)